The 2007–08 Mid-American Conference season was its 62nd season in existence.  The Mid-American Conference (MAC) competed at Division I in the National Collegiate Athletic Association.  It sponsored 23 sports (11 men's and 12 women's).

Teams

Four schools have affiliate membership status:

Reese and Jacoby trophies
The Reese and Jacoby trophies are awarded to the top men's and women's athletic departments in the Mid-American Conference.

Points are awarded based on each school's finish, with the overall total divided by the number of sports sponsored by each school. An institution may count either indoor track and field or outdoor track and field but not both.

Reese standings

* Affiliate status only.  Does not qualify for trophy.

Jacoby standings

* Affiliate status only. Does not qualify for trophy.

Sports

Baseball
The 2008 baseball season begins in February 2008 and concludes with the NCAA Tournament in June 2008.  Kent State is the defending East division and conference tournament champion and finished 0-2 in the 2007 NCAA baseball tournament.  Eastern Michigan won the MAC West division.

Standings

East

West

Basketball (men's)
The 2007-08 men's basketball season begins in November 2007 and concludes with the NCAA Tournament in March 2008.  Miami won the 2007 conference tournament, defeating East division champion Akron in the finals.  Miami was seeded 14th in the 2007 NCAA Men's Division I Basketball Tournament and lost to 3rd seed Oregon in the first round.  Toledo is the defending West division champion.

Kent State was picked by the MAC News Media Association to win the East Division and Western Michigan was picked to win the West Division.  Kent State was picked to win the MAC Tournament.

Standings

Tournament

Players of the week
The following are the MAC men's basketball players of the week.  Number of awards won this season are in parentheses.

Basketball (women's)
The 2007-08 women's basketball season begins in November 2007 and concludes with the NCAA Tournament in March 2008.  East division champion Bowling Green defeated West champion Ball State in the finals of the conference tournament.  Bowling Green, which entered the 2007 NCAA Women's Division I Basketball Tournament ranked 18th and 20th in the USA Today Coaches Poll and Associated Press Poll, respectively, was seeded 7th and advanced to the Sweet Sixteen, defeating 10th seeded Oklahoma State and 2nd seeded Vanderbilt along the way.

Standings

* Received W1 seed based on 2-0 head-to-head record vs. Eastern Michigan.

Tournament

* double overtime

Players of the week
The following are the MAC women's basketball players of the week.  Number of awards won this season are in parentheses.

Cross country (men's)
The 2007 men's cross country season began in August 2007 and concluded with the NCAA Men's Cross Country Championship in November 2007.  Eastern Michigan won the team championship, placing three runners in the top 5.  Miami was the runner up.  Josh Perrin of EMU won the individual championship.  The win was EMU's third consecutive team championship.

Nine of the ten MAC teams competed in the NCAA Great Lakes Regional.  Eastern Michigan finished 7th, followed by Miami (9th), Kent State (10th), Central Michigan (12th), Ohio (14th), Akron  (18th), Toledo (29th).  Bowling Green did not place.  Buffalo competed in the Northeast Regional and finished 18th.  No teams qualified to compete in the NCAA Cross Country Championships.

Josh Karanja (Eastern Michigan), Craig Leon (Ohio) and Pat Sovacool (Miami) qualified for the individual championship.  Leon finished 106th, Sovacool 135th and Karanja 150th.

Champions
 Team: Eastern Michigan
 Individual: Josh Perrin, Eastern Michigan (24:33)

MAC Championship results
 Eastern Michigan, 31 points
 Miami, 50
 Central Michigan, 98
 Ohio, 116
 Akron, 120
 Kent State, 130
 Buffalo, 180
 Bowling Green, 241
 Toledo, 258

Players of the week

Cross country (women's)
The 2007 women's cross country season began in August 2007 and concludes with the NCAA Women's Cross Country Championship in November 2007.  Ohio won its second team championship in as many years.  Laura Neufarth of Miami won the individual championship.

Champions
 Team: Ohio
 Individual: Laura Neufarth, Miami (17:35)

MAC Championship results
 Ohio, 56 points
 Akron, 58
 Miami, 77
 Toledo, 89
 Ball State, 135
 Central Michigan, 174
 Bowling Green, 218
 Western Michigan, 224
 Kent State, 230
 Buffalo, 232
 Eastern Michigan, 286
 NIU, 289

Players of the week

Field hockey
Ohio captured the Mid-American Conference regular season championship, finishing 2 games better than second place Kent State.  Ohio also won the MAC tournament championship, defeating Miami 3-2 in overtime.  The victory marked the first time an Ohio field hockey team has won the regular season and tournament championships two years in a row.  Ohio was ranked 15 in the final 
STX/NFHCA Division I National Coaches Poll.

Ohio defeated American University 3-2 in the NCAA Women's Field Hockey Championship Opening Round game.  Ohio lost to #6 ranked Michigan Wolverines 1-0 in overtime in the First Round of the tournament.

Tournament
The conference tournament took place November 1 through November 3 in Oxford, OH.

All-tournament team
 Torrie Albini, F, Ohio
 Taylor Florence, F, Miami
 Danielle Gaynor, MF, Miami
 Louise Gerike, GK, Central Michigan
 Nikki Gnozzio, D, Ohio
 Jessie Martin, GK, Ohio
 Anna McComb, MF, Kent State
 Rachel Miller, F, Kent State
 Alyssa Nye, F, Miami
 Kim Sihota, MF, Central Michigan

Standings

Players of the week

Awards
 Player of the Year: Jessie Martin, Ohio
 Coach of the Year: Kathleen Schanne, Kent State
 Freshman of the Year: Rachel Miller, Kent State
 All MAC, First Team
 Rachelle Coetzee, Ohio, Midfielder, Senior
 Lauren Cruz, Ball State, Midfielder, Senior
 Kim Erasmus, Central Michigan, Midfielder, Sophomore
 Taylor Florence, Miami, Forward, Senior
 Nikki Gnozzio, Ohio, Forward, Sophomore
 Sarah Johnson, Missouri State, Defense, Junior
 Brooke MacGillivary, Ball State, Forward, Sophomore
 Jessie Martin, Ohio, Goalkeeper, Junior
 Rachel Miller, Kent State, Forward, Freshman
 Charlotte Muller, Kent State, Midfielder, Senior
 Alyssa Nye, Miami, Forward, Senior

Football

The 2007 MAC football season began in August 2007 and concludes with the 2008 GMAC Bowl on January 6, 2008.

Players of the week

Golf (men's)

MAC Championship
 Eastern Michigan
 Kent State
 Ball State
 Toledo
 Akron
 Miami
 Ohio
 Bowling Green
 NIU

Players of the week

Golf (women's)

MAC Championship
 Kent State (1177)
 Eastern Michigan (1228)
 Toledo (1232)
 Western Michigan (1272)
 Ball State (1277)
 Ohio (1297)
 NIU (1308)
 Bowling Green (1310)

Gymnastics

MAC Championship
 Kent State, 195.675 points
 Eastern Michigan, 193.800 
 Central Michigan, 193.675
 NIU, 193.375
 Western Michigan, 192.500
 Ball State, 192.100
 Bowling Green, 192.025

Players of the week
The following are the gymnastics players of the week. Number of awards won this season are in parentheses.

Soccer (men's)

Tournament

* Hartwick advances 4-2 on penalty kicks
† Double overtime

Standings

Players of the week

Soccer (women's)

Tournament

* Overtime
** Bowling Green advances 3-0 on penalty kicks
† Toledo advances 4-3 on penalty kicks
‡ Toledo wins championship 3-2 on penalty kicks

Standings

Players of the week

Softball

Standings

East

West

Players of the week

Swimming (men's)

Standings

MAC Championship results
 Eastern Michigan, 589 points
 Miami, 315.5
 Buffalo, 200
 Ball State, 111

Players of the week

Swimming (women's)

Standings

MAC Championship results
 Ohio, 679.5 points
 Toledo, 605.5
 Eastern Michigan, 575
 Miami, 538
 Buffalo, 341
 Bowling Green, 333.5
 Akron, 246
 Ball State, 175.5

Players of the week

Tennis (men's)

Players of the week

Tennis (women's)

Players of the week

Track and field (men's)

Indoor MAC Championships
 1. Eastern Michigan, 207 points
 2. Akron, 124
 3. Kent State, 98
 4. Central Michigan, 47
 4. Buffalo, 47

Outdoor MAC Championships
 Akron, 182 points
 Eastern Michigan, 182
 Kent State, 153
 Miami, 192.5
 Central Michigan, 85.5
 Buffalo, 79

Players of the week

Track and field (women's)

Indoor MAC Championships
 Akron, 106 points
 Western Michigan, 96
 Miami, 88
 Ball State, 86
 Central Michigan, 55.50
 Buffalo, 50.50
 Eastern Michigan, 40.50
 Kent State, 34
 Toledo, 32.50
 Ohio, 32
 Bowling Green, 26.50
 NIU, 12.50

Outdoor MAC Championships
1 Akron, 208.5 points
2 Western Michigan, 153
3 Miami, 73.5
4 Kent State, 73
5 Central Michigan, 64
6 Buffalo, 50.5
7 Ohio, 43
8 Toledo, 35.5
9 Eastern Michigan, 35
9 Ball State, 35
11 Bowling Green, 29
12 NIU, 18

Players of the week

Volleyball
The 2007 Mid-American Conference volleyball season begins in August and ends with the NCAA Tournament in November.  The MAC Tournament begins November 13 on campus sites and concludes with the finals November 18 at the SeaGate Convention Centre in Toledo, OH.

Tournament

Standings

Players of the week

Wrestling
Central Michigan was picked to win the MAC Championship by the league coaches.  Kent State was picked to finish second.  The 2008 MAC Championships will be held March 8 through 9, 2008 at Kent State.

Standings

Players of the week

See also
 Mid-American Conference
 List of Mid-American Conference champions

References

External links
 Official website

Mid-American Conference seasons